FC Moush may refer to:
FC Moush Charentsavan, an association football club from Charentsavan, Armenia.
FC Moush Kasakh, an association football club from the village of Kasakh, Armenia.